Ostyak is a name formerly used to refer to several indigenous peoples in Siberia.

Ostyak may also refer to:

Ethnic groups
 Khanty people or Ostyaks, indigenous people in Khanty–Mansi Autonomous Okrug, Russia
 Ket people or Yenisei Ostyaks, indigenous people of the Yenisei River basin, Krasnoyarsk Krai district, Russia
 Selkup people or Ostyak-Samoyeds, indigenous people in Tomsk Oblast, Krasnoyarsk Krai, Yamalo-Nenets Autonomous Okrug, and Nenets Autonomous Okrug, Russia
 Perm (Ostyak) Tatars, a subgroup of the Volga Tatars ethnic group

Language
 Yenisei-Ostyak, a language family whose languages are spoken in central Siberia
 Khanty language or Ostyak, language mainly spoken by the Khanty people 
 Ket language or Yenisei Ostyak, the sole surviving language of a Yeniseian language family
 Selkup language, a language in the Samoyedic group of the Uralic language family mainly spoken by the Selkup people

See also
 Khutang or Ostyak harp, a type of harp played by the Khanty and Mansi people